Radivoj Božić (26 January 1912 – 1948) was a Serbian Yugoslavia international footballer. After finishing his football career he became a military pilot in the Royal Yugoslav Air Force and during the Second World War for the Yugoslav Partisans.

Career
Born in Beška, Austro-Hungarian Empire (nowadays in Serbia), he started playing in SK Jugoslavija in 1930. In 1932 he moved to BSK Beograd and a year later he won the 1932–33 Yugoslav First League playing as a left-back. During the late 1930s until 1941 he played with FK Vojvodina.

Božić played one match for the Yugoslav national team.  It was played in Athens, Greece, on December 225, 1934, in a 1934–35 Balkan Cup match against Bulgaria, a 4-3 win. Yugoslavia won the tournament that year.

Honours
BSK Beograd
Yugoslav championship: 1932–33, 1934–35, 1935–36

Yugoslavia
Balkan Cup: 1935

Military pilot
He graduated on October 12, 1938 at the Royal Yugoslav Air Force military academy and became military pilot. During Second World War he joined the air force of the Yugoslav Partisans, however he got captured by the Germans who sent him to Germany. It is not exactly known when and why he returned to Belgrade, but allegedly because of treason, he was shot by the new Yugoslav authorities in 1948.

References

1912 births
1948 deaths
Serbian footballers
Yugoslav footballers
Yugoslavia international footballers
SK Jugoslavija players
OFK Beograd players
FK Vojvodina players
Yugoslav First League players
Association football defenders
Royal Yugoslav Air Force personnel